A blockade is the act of actively preventing a country or region from receiving or sending out food, supplies, weapons, or communications, and sometimes people, by military force.
A blockade differs from an embargo or sanction, which are legal barriers to trade rather than physical barriers. It is also distinct from a siege in that a blockade is usually directed at an entire country or region, rather than a fortress or city and the objective may not always be to conquer the area.

While most blockades historically took place at sea, blockades are also used on land to prevent entrance of an area.  For example, Armenia is a landlocked country that Turkey and Azerbaijan blockade.  Thus, Armenia cannot conduct international trade through those countries, and mainly trades through Georgia.  This restricts the country's economic development. 

A blockading power can seek to cut off all maritime transport from and to the blockaded country; although stopping all land transport to and from an area may also be considered a blockade. Blockades restrict the trading rights of neutrals, who must submit for inspection for contraband, which the blockading power may define narrowly or broadly, sometimes including food and medicine. In the 20th century, air power has also been used to enhance the effectiveness of the blockade by halting air traffic within the blockaded airspace.

Close patrol of hostile ports, in order to prevent naval forces from putting to sea, is also referred to as a blockade. When coastal cities or fortresses were besieged from the landward side, the besiegers would often blockade the seaward side as well. Most recently, blockades have sometimes included cutting off electronic communications by jamming radio signals and severing undersea cables.

History
Although primitive naval blockades had been in use for millennia, the first successful attempts at establishing a full naval blockade were made by the British Royal Navy during the Seven Years' War (1754–1763) against France. Following the British naval victory at Quiberon Bay, which ended any immediate threat of a major invasion of Britain, Britain established a close blockade on the French coast. This starved French ports of commerce, weakening France's economy. Admiral Edward Hawke took command of the blockading fleet off Brest and extended the blockade to cover the entire French Atlantic coast from Dunkirk to Bordeaux, and also to Marseilles on France's Mediterranean coast.

The strategic importance of blockade was shown during the French Revolutionary Wars and Napoleonic Wars, when the Royal Navy successfully blockaded France, leading to major economic disruptions. The Union blockade of southern ports was a major factor in the American Civil War During World War I, the Allies blockaded the Central Powers, depriving them of food and other strategic materials. Germany's attempted U-boat blockade caused some shortages in Britain, but ultimately failed. This outcome was repeated in World War II.

Naval strategic thinkers, such as Sir Julian Corbett and Alfred Thayer Mahan, wrote that naval conflicts were won primarily by decisive battles, and but also by blockade.

Types of blockade

Close, distant, and loose blockades
A close blockade entails placing warships within sight of the blockaded coast or port, to ensure the immediate interception of any ship entering or leaving. It is both the most effective and the most difficult form of blockade to implement. Difficulties arise because the blockading ships must remain continuously at sea, exposed to storms and hardship, usually far from any support, and vulnerable to sudden attack from the blockaded side, whose ships may stay safe in harbor until they choose to come out.

In a distant blockade, the blockaders stay well away from the blockaded coast and try to intercept any ships going in or out. This may require more ships on station, but they can usually operate closer to their bases, and are at much less risk from enemy raids. This was almost impossible prior to the 16th century due to the nature of the ships used.

A loose blockade is a close blockade where the blockading ships are withdrawn out of sight from the coast (behind the horizon) but no farther. The object of loose blockade is to lure the enemy into venturing out but to stay close enough to strike.

British admiral Horatio Nelson applied a loose blockade at Cádiz in 1805. The Franco-Spanish fleet under Pierre-Charles Villeneuve then came out, resulting in the Battle of Trafalgar.

Pacific blockade
Until 1827, blockades, as part of economic warfare, were always a part of a war. This changed when France, Russia and Britain came to the aid of the Greek rebels against Turkey. They blockaded the Turkish-occupied coast, which led to the battle of Navarino. War was never declared, however, so it is considered the first pacific — i.e. peaceful — blockade. The first truly pacific blockade, involving no shooting at all, was the British blockade of the Republic of New Granada in 1837, established to compel New Granada to release an imprisoned British consul.

Legal status

Since 1945, the United Nations Security Council determines the legal status of blockades and by article 42 of the UN Charter, the council can also apply blockades. The UN Charter allows for the right of self-defense but requires that this must be immediately reported to the Security Council to ensure the maintenance of international peace.

According to the not ratified document San Remo Manual on International Law Applicable to Armed Conflicts at Sea, 12 June 1994, a blockade is a legal method of warfare at sea but is governed by rules. The manual describes what can never be contraband. The blockading nation is free to select anything else as contraband in a list, which it must publish.

The blockading nation typically establishes a blockaded area of water, but any ship can be inspected as soon as it is established that it is attempting to break the blockade. This inspection can occur inside the blockaded area or in international waters, but never inside the territorial waters of a neutral nation. A neutral ship must obey a request to stop for inspection from the blockading nation. If the situation so demands, the blockading nation can request that the ship divert to a known place or harbour for inspection. If the ship does not stop, then the ship is subject to capture. If people aboard the ship resist capture, they can be lawfully attacked.

Act of war

Whether or not a blockade was seen as lawful depended on the laws of the nations whose trade was influenced by the blockade. The Brazilian blockade of Río de la Plata in 1826 during the Cisplatine War, for instance, was considered lawful according to British law but unlawful according to French and American law. The latter two countries announced they would actively defend their ships against Brazilian blockaders, while Britain was forced to steer for a peaceful solution between Brazil and Argentina.

Civil disobedience 

There are a number of protest actions with the specific aim of cutting off material, people or communications from a particular area, either in part or totally. The effectiveness of such blockades rely on the participation of people and lock-on techniques.

A sit-down strike is a form of civil disobedience in which an organized group of workers, usually employed at a factory or other centralized location, take possession of the workplace by "sitting down" at their stations, effectively preventing their employers from replacing them with strikebreakers. A nonviolent picket is another example; it also illustrates the specificity of the blockade. Pickets may demand the blocking of some traffic while allowing other traffic; e.g. workers but not the customers, or customers but not workers.

The Mau movement was a nonviolent movement for Samoan independence from colonial rule during the early 1900s. Amongst other actions, participants formed their own "police force", picketing stores in Apia to prevent the payment of customs to the authorities.
Some other examples are the perimeter blockade by human chain at Greenham Common Women's Peace Camp, the blockade of the Franklin River dam site, and the Keystone Pipeline.

Blockade planning 

Blockades depend on four general factors

 The value of the item being blockaded must warrant the need to blockade. For example, during the 1962 Cuban Missile Crisis, the items to be blockaded (or "quarantined" to use the more neutral term selected by President John F. Kennedy) were Medium-range ballistic missiles, capable of delivering nuclear weaponry, bound for Cuba. Their value was high, as a military threat against the United States.
 The strength of the blockading force must be equal to or greater in strength than the opposition. The blockade is only successful if the 'thing' in question is prevented from reaching its receiver. For example, the overwhelming power of the Royal Navy allowed a successful blockade of Germany.
 Geography.  Knowing the routes of the enemy will help the blockader choose where to blockade: for example, a high mountain pass or a strait is a natural choke point and a candidate for fortification.
 A blockade tends to be a long campaign requiring a long-term commitment by the blockading power. The Atlantic U-boat campaign of World War I and Battle of the Atlantic were essentially about German blockades, and lasted nearly as long as their respective wars.  The Imperial Japanese Navy, however, made only sporadic efforts at blockade during the Pacific war, preferring to seek victory by fleet action.

Blockade running

Blockade running is the practice of delivering cargo (food, for example) to a blockaded area. It has mainly been done by ships (called blockade runners) across ports under naval blockade. Blockade runners were typically the fastest ships available and often lightly armed and armored. It is now also been done by aircraft, forming airbridges, such as over the Berlin blockade after World War II.

See also
 Blockade of the Gaza Strip
 Command of the sea
 List of historical blockades
 Maritime Exclusion Zone
 No-fly zone
 Sea lines of communication

References

 

 
Law of the sea
Military strategy
Military operations by type
Economic warfare tactics